David Paul Roselle (born May 30, 1939) is an American mathematician and academic administrator who served as the ninth president of the University of Kentucky and the 25th president of the University of Delaware.

Early life and family
David Roselle was born in Vandergrift, Pennsylvania, a suburb of Pittsburgh.  He married Louise Helen Dowling, a native of Manhasset, New York, in 1967.  The couple has two children, Arthur (born 1970) and Cynthia (born 1972).

Education and academic concentration
In 1961, Roselle received a bachelor's degree from West Chester State College (now West Chester University of Pennsylvania).  In 1965, he received his Ph.D. in mathematics from Duke University.

Within the field of Mathematics, Roselle specializes in Number Theory, Combinatorics, and Eulerian mathematical functions.

Early career
After earning his doctorate, Roselle joined the faculty of the University of Maryland, where he taught until leaving for a faculty position at Louisiana State University in 1968.  In 1974, at the age of 35, Roselle was granted tenure as a professor at Virginia Tech.

Roselle chaired several commissions at the university, including the Commission on Graduate Studies, the Commission on Research, and the Commission on Undergraduate Studies.  In 1978, he was awarded Virginia Tech's Teaching Excellence Certificate.

Outside of Virginia Tech, Roselle continued to contribute to education and the field of mathematics.  He joined the Mathematical Association of America and served as the organization's secretary from 1975 until 1984.  He reviewed articles for several peer-reviewed journals, including Mathematical Reviews.  He became a member of the Society for Industrial and Applied Mathematics, the American Mathematical Society, and the National Council of Teachers of Mathematics, which presented him with its Certificate of Appreciation in 1984.

In 1976, Roselle's undergraduate Alma mater granted him its Distinguished Alumnus Award and in 1994 that institution awarded him an honorary doctoral degree.

In 1979, at 40 years of age, Roselle was appointed dean of the Graduate School for Virginia Tech.  In 1981, he was named Dean of Research and Graduate Studies.  In 1983, Roselle was appointed provost of Virginia Tech.

As provost, Roselle worked to increase support for sponsored research. He pushed for upgrades in campus information systems and strived to ensure computing resources were available to all students.

President of the University of Kentucky
On July 1, 1987, David Roselle became the ninth president of the University of Kentucky.  Although the position thrust Roselle into national prominence in the field of academia, his tenure was often rocky.

Much of Roselle's time as president of the University of Kentucky was absorbed by a scandal that erupted in 1988 involving the men's basketball team.  The NCAA alleged 17 violations of the organization's rules.  The most serious allegations were that a basketball recruit, Eric Manuel, received help on the ACT college entrance exam and another recruit, Chris Mills, received $1,000 in cash from assistant coach Dwane Casey.

Roselle was widely praised for his decisive response to the scandal.  Roselle forced head coach Eddie Sutton to resign in favor of then-New York Knicks coach Rick Pitino. He also forced athletic director Cliff Hagan to resign in favor of C. M. Newton. Additionally, he launched an extensive internal investigation, implemented new policies which tightened control of the athletic department, and cooperated completely with NCAA investigators.  These actions were credited with preventing the basketball team from being disbanded for two seasons, as the NCAA's Committee on Infractions initially recommended.

Although Roselle handled the basketball scandal deftly, the ordeal still absorbed precious time and resources that the President had intended to spend on other goals.  However, he still succeeded in creating a new position, the Vice President for Information System, to continue his push for greater access to technology on campus.

After stepping down as the University's president, the University of Kentucky National Alumni Association awarded him its Distinguished Service Award. On October 25, 2011, the Board of Trustees of the University of Kentucky unanimously approved renaming the temporarily named "New North Hall," a recently constructed 144 bed residence building, as "David P. Roselle Hall".

President of the University of Delaware
In the wake of the basketball scandal and proposed budget cuts by the Kentucky Legislature, Roselle left the University of Kentucky to accept a post as president of the University of Delaware.  He was unanimously elected the University's 25th president by the board of trustees.  His term began May 1, 1990. He was the highest-paid public university president in the nation, making $874,687 annually.

Roselle's tenure as president was marked by aggressive fund-raising campaigns and an increase in fiscal discipline. Through privatizing many services and other cost-cutting measures, he cut the university's annual budget by $32 million and eliminated the school's $8 million annual deficit. Under Roselle's leadership, the University's endowment more than tripled from $362 million when he took office in 1990 to over $1.4 billion in 2006.

In addition to the increase in the endowment, Roselle's fundraising allowed for the renovation of over a dozen older buildings and the construction of several new buildings on campus.  The new buildings include a student center named after former University President Edward A. Trabant, the Charles C. Allen Jr. Laboratory, MBNA America Hall (now Alfred Lerner Hall), Gore Hall, and the Louise and David Roselle Center For the Arts, which was named in his wife and his honor.  The renovations and new construction were a part of a general campus beautification project that included brick walkways, ivy wall coverings, and the planting of new trees.

As he had at Virginia Tech and University of Kentucky, Roselle also made student access to technology a top priority.  Not long after the beginning of his tenure as president, every class room, residence hall room, and office was wired to the campus' computer network.

Roselle was also active in the community of the state of Delaware.  In addition to acting as president of its top university, he served on the boards of Winterthur Museum, the Wilmington Grand Opera House, Blue Cross/Blue Shield of Delaware and the Wilmington Trust Company. He is also a member of the Boards of OCLC, Brown Advisory and SOKA University. In 2005, Roselle and Robert Carothers were the first recipients of the American Council on Education's Fellows Mentor Award.

His intent was to resign on May 1, 2007, exactly 17 years after his term began, but Roselle served until July 1, 2007, when he was succeeded by Patrick T. Harker, formerly dean of the Wharton School of the University of Pennsylvania.

On June 1, 2008, Roselle began service as interim director of Winterthur Museum, Garden and Country Estate. In November of the same year he was named Winterthur's director.

In 2012, Delaware Today named Roselle as one of "The 50 Most Influential Delawareans in the Past 50 Years." The accompanying citation highlighted improvements at the University of Delaware during his tenure.

External links
 Official Biography from the University of Kentucky
 American Press Institute Biography
 Article on UD endowment
 Article on the Pay of University Presidents
 Article on Retirement from UD

1939 births
Duke University alumni
West Chester University alumni
University of Maryland, College Park faculty
Presidents of the University of Delaware
Living people
Louisiana State University faculty
People from New Castle County, Delaware
People from Westmoreland County, Pennsylvania
Presidents of the University of Kentucky
People associated with Winterthur Museum, Garden and Library